The 2020 Conference USA men's basketball tournament was to be the concluding event of the 2019–20 Conference USA (C-USA) men's basketball season. It was to be held from March 11–14, 2020 alongside the C-USA women's tournament in Frisco, Texas, at the Ford Center at The Star. The winner of the tournament was to receive the conference's automatic bid to the 2020 NCAA tournament. Only the first day of games were played before the tournament was cancelled due to the COVID-19 pandemic.

Seeds
Only 12 conference teams play in the tournament. The top four teams receive a bye to the quarterfinals of the tournament. Teams are seeded within one of three groups. After each team had played 14 conference games, the teams were divided into groups based on conference record at that point in the season. The top five teams were placed in one group, the next five in a second group, and the bottom four in a final group. All teams were at that time locked into a seeding range that corresponded to their group—for example, the top five teams were assured the top five seeds. The remaining four conference games were played strictly within each group. The final seeding within each group is determined by overall conference record, with a tiebreaker system to seed teams with identical conference records. Only the top two teams within the bottom group enter the tournament.

Schedule
Rankings denote tournament seed.

Bracket

* denotes overtime period.

See also
 2020 Conference USA women's basketball tournament

References

Tournament
Conference USA men's basketball tournament
Basketball events curtailed due to the COVID-19 pandemic
College sports tournaments in Texas
Sports in Frisco, Texas
Basketball competitions in Texas
2020 in sports in Texas
March 2020 sports events in the United States